Salt Palace may refer to:
Salt Palace convention center in Salt Lake City
First Salt Palace, former theater in Salt Lake City
Salt Palace (arena), former arena in Salt Lake City
Museum of the Imperial Palace of Manchukuo, former Manchukuo imperial residence called the Salt Palace